John Stephen Shaw (10 April 1924 – April 2011) was an English footballer who played in the Football League for Rotherham United and Sheffield Wednesday.

References

English footballers
English Football League players
1924 births
2011 deaths
Rotherham United F.C. players
Sheffield Wednesday F.C. players
Association football forwards